Bongani Zungu (born 9 October 1992) is a South African professional soccer player who plays as a midfielder for Mamelodi Sundowns and the South Africa national team.

Club career
Having joined the University of Pretoria from Dynamos at the start of the 2012–13 season, Zungu helped AmaTuks to a top eight finish in the club's debut campaign in the PSL. At the end of the season it was announced that Zungu would be joining Mamelodi Sundowns in a swap deal, with Buhle Mkhwanazi and Siyabonga Ngubane joining University of Pretoria.

Zungu suffered a hairline fracture of the shin in a 3–2 win over Maritzburg United, ruling him out for up to twelve weeks. Despite missing most of the second half of the 2015–16 season, Zungu had the perfect send off from Sundowns with the club lifting the PSL title in May.

On 20 January 2016, Zungu's agent Steve Kapeluschnik confirmed that he would be joining Portuguese side Vitória de Guimarães upon the expiration of his contract at the end of the season. After a season in Portugal, Zungu moved to French club Amiens. 

Zungu signed for Scottish club Rangers on loan from Amiens in October 2020. Rangers secured an option to sign him permanently for a £2.7 million transfer fee. In February 2021 he was one of five Rangers players fined by Scottish police "for attending an illegal gathering of 10 people in a flat" in breach of lockdown rules during the COVID-19 pandemic in the United Kingdom.

International career
Zungu made his debut for South Africa in a 2–0 win against Burkina Faso on 17 August 2013. He scored his first international goal against Swaziland on 15 November 2013, with South Africa winning 3–0.

Personal life
In July 2014 Zungu was a victim of a hi-jacking when a group of armed men made off with his car outside his home in Duduza.

Career statistics

Club

International

Scores and results list South Africa's goal tally first, score column indicates score after each Zungu goal.

Honours
Mamelodi Sundowns
 PSL: 2013–14; 2015–16
 Nedbank Cup: 2014–15
 Telkom Knockout: 2015–16

Rangers
Scottish Premiership: 2020–21

References

External links
 
 

1992 births
Living people
People from Duduza
Sportspeople from Gauteng
Zulu people
South African soccer players
Association football midfielders
Primeira Liga players
Ligue 1 players
Dynamos F.C. (South Africa) players
University of Pretoria F.C. players
Mamelodi Sundowns F.C. players
Vitória S.C. players
Amiens SC players
Rangers F.C. players
South Africa international soccer players
2015 Africa Cup of Nations players
2019 Africa Cup of Nations players
South African expatriate soccer players
Expatriate footballers in France
South African expatriate sportspeople in France
Expatriate footballers in Portugal
South African expatriate sportspeople in Portugal
Expatriate footballers in Scotland
South African expatriate sportspeople in Scotland
Scottish Professional Football League players